Opononi is a settlement on the south shore of Hokianga Harbour in Northland, New Zealand. State Highway 12 runs through Opononi. Ōmāpere is on the shore to the south of Opononi and Pakanae to the northeast.

History

European settlement
In 1855, John Webster, who had arrived in New Zealand in 1841, bought 700 acres of rough land at Opononi and established a homestead and pastoral farm which he developed into a showplace, entertaining vice-royalty several times. He also built a wharf, gum-store and a trading store. In 1894, Webster put the house and farm on the market. The store and gum store were taken over by Alfred Sprye Andrewes who later converted the gum store into a two storey hotel.

20th century

The Opononi Post and Telephone was opened in 1892 and operated until 1989.  The road between Opononi and Ōmāpere was developed in the mid 1930s leading to ribbon development. In 1959, a fire destroyed the Opononi Hotel and Opononi Store.

Opononi became famous throughout New Zealand in the summer of 1955 and 1956 due to the exploits of a dolphin called Opo.

Marae

Opononi and Pakanae have two marae affiliated with the Ngāpuhi hapū of Ngāti Korokoro, Ngāti Whārara and Te Poukā:
 Pākanae Marae and Maraeroa meeting house
 Kōkōhuia or Ōmāpere Marae and Te Whakarongotai meeting house (also affiliated with Ngāti Te Pou)

In October 2020, the Government committed $470,000 from the Provincial Growth Fund to upgrade Pakanae Marae, creating 11 jobs.

Demographics
Statistics New Zealand describes Opononi as a rural settlement. The settlement is part of the larger Waipoua Forest statistical area.

Opononi had a population of 252 at the 2018 New Zealand census, an increase of 48 people (23.5%) since the 2013 census, and an increase of 30 people (13.5%) since the 2006 census. There were 105 households, comprising 108 males and 141 females, giving a sex ratio of 0.77 males per female. The median age was 52.7 years (compared with 37.4 years nationally), with 42 people (16.7%) aged under 15 years, 27 (10.7%) aged 15 to 29, 96 (38.1%) aged 30 to 64, and 84 (33.3%) aged 65 or older.

Ethnicities were 58.3% European/Pākehā, 63.1% Māori, 4.8% Pacific peoples, 4.8% Asian, and 1.2% other ethnicities. People may identify with more than one ethnicity.

Although some people chose not to answer the census's question about religious affiliation, 34.5% had no religion, 53.6% were Christian, 3.6% had Māori religious beliefs, 1.2% were Hindu and 1.2% were Buddhist.

Of those at least 15 years old, 21 (10.0%) people had a bachelor's or higher degree, and 48 (22.9%) people had no formal qualifications. The median income was $20,200, compared with $31,800 nationally. 6 people (2.9%) earned over $70,000 compared to 17.2% nationally. The employment status of those at least 15 was that 48 (22.9%) people were employed full-time, 39 (18.6%) were part-time, and 18 (8.6%) were unemployed.

Waipoua Forest statistical area

Waipoua Forest had a population of 1,215 at the 2018 New Zealand census, an increase of 180 people (17.4%) since the 2013 census, and an increase of 96 people (8.6%) since the 2006 census. There were 504 households, comprising 579 males and 633 females, giving a sex ratio of 0.91 males per female. The median age was 50.4 years (compared with 37.4 years nationally), with 222 people (18.3%) aged under 15 years, 162 (13.3%) aged 15 to 29, 516 (42.5%) aged 30 to 64, and 318 (26.2%) aged 65 or older.

Ethnicities were 58.8% European/Pākehā, 57.3% Māori, 3.7% Pacific peoples, 2.0% Asian, and 0.7% other ethnicities. People may identify with more than one ethnicity.

The percentage of people born overseas was 9.1, compared with 27.1% nationally.

Although some people chose not to answer the census's question about religious affiliation, 42.5% had no religion, 44.4% were Christian, 3.0% had Māori religious beliefs, 0.5% were Hindu, 0.2% were Muslim, 0.5% were Buddhist and 0.5% had other religions.

Of those at least 15 years old, 123 (12.4%) people had a bachelor's or higher degree, and 219 (22.1%) people had no formal qualifications. The median income was $18,800, compared with $31,800 nationally. 51 people (5.1%) earned over $70,000 compared to 17.2% nationally. The employment status of those at least 15 was that 270 (27.2%) people were employed full-time, 195 (19.6%) were part-time, and 72 (7.3%) were unemployed.

Education

The first school was the Pakia Native School which opened in 1874 under the Native School Act. In 1912 the school was renamed Omapere. Opononi did not have a school of its own and children either went to Pakia/Omapere School, or after it opened in 1909, to Pakanae School. In 1974, the newly built Opononi Area School replaced both.

Opononi Area School is a coeducational composite (years 1-15) school with a roll of  students.

Notes

External links

Welcome to Opononi

Hokianga
Populated places in the Northland Region